Srđan Šaper (born October 9, 1958) is a founder of I&F McCann Grupa. He is also well known as a founder and a member of the Yugoslav new wave band Idoli in the 1980s.

Biography 
In March 1979, with friends Krstić and Vlada Divljan, 20-year-old Šaper formed Idoli, a new wave band that quickly became popular throughout SFR Yugoslavia. 

In the following years, I&F McCann Grupa established agencies in other countries in the Balkan region, and today the group operates in twelve countries of South East Europe and Nordic region.

Srđan Šaper is the owner of the Novembar art gallery in Belgrade. He is also the author of the original idea for the TV series BESA.

He had been identified as one of two dozen Serbian citizens mentioned in the Panama Papers.

Musical career

VIS Dečaci and Idoli
Šaper became interested in forming a musical group with his friend Nebojša Krstić and at a party during the late 1979 he made a deal with his close high school friend Vlada Divljan to start playing together. Šaper and Krstić were to play guitar and Divljan was to be the drummer. The band was called Dečaci (The Boys). Divljan took them to his apartment building basement where he and his friends kept their instruments and tried playing. Having realized there was no progress, the band was joined by Divljan's friends and neighbors Zdenko Kolar (bass) and Boža Jovanović (drums) with whom he previously played. Krstić and Šaper became percussionists and did the vocals. Since the two wore beards, the band was renamed to Dečaci plus Bradonje (The Boys plus The Bearded). The band was soon renamed to Idoli.

Post Idoli career 
In 1996 both Šaper and Krstić appeared on the Akcija self-titled debut on the track "7 dana". Since then, they have not recorded nor performed live, and in 1999 the songs "Razvod 1999" and "Parada" appeared on the various artists compilation Rock 'n' roll - "Ravno do dna" i druge, manje-više, čudnovate pjesme (1980-'89).

Discography

With Idoli

With Nebojša Krstić

Studio albums 
 Poslednja mladost u Jugoslaviji (1987)

Singles 
 "Razvod 1999" / "Parada" (1999)

With Dobrovoljno Pevačko Društvo 
 Nedelja na Duhove (1995)

With Akcija 
 Akcija (1996) - guest on the track "7 dana" ("7 Days")

References

External links 
 Ex Yu Rock enciklopedija 1960-2006, Janjatović Petar; 
 Srđan Šaper interview (Serbian source)
 

1958 births
Living people
Musicians from Belgrade
Serbian rock singers
Yugoslav musicians
Yugoslav rock singers
Serbian people of Greek descent